Lecocarpus is a plant genus in the family Asteraceae, native to Galápagos Islands, part of Ecuador.

 Species
 Lecocarpus darwinii H.Adsersen 
 Lecocarpus lecocarpoides (B.L.Rob. & Greenm ) Cronquist & Stuessy 
 Lecocarpus pinnatifidus Decne.

References

External links

 Charles Darwin Foundation Report on Species endangered of extinction (including Lecocarpus lecocarpoides, vulnerable in IUCN Redlist) in Galápagos

 
Flora of the Galápagos Islands
Asteraceae genera
Taxa named by Joseph Decaisne